Ethereal Menace is the third album by South African gothic rock band The Awakening released in July 1999. The album utilizes elements of industrial music, a style later dubbed as "dark future rock"  by Nyte.  Another music video was produced by South African Music Awards winner, director Eban Olivier's Concrete Productions, for the single "The March."  The video was placed in rotation on MTV Europe.

Recording
In November 1998, the album Ethereal Menace was written, performed, engineered, and produced by Ashton Nyte, and mastered by Graham Handley at Street 16.

Track listing
All songs written by Ashton Nyte.

"In Etherea" 
"Naked" 
"Chains" 
"Wasted Miracle" 
"Still the Sun" 
"Sentimental Runaways"
"Nostalgia" 
"The March (part 1)" 
"The March (part 2)" 
"Dreams on Fire"

References

The Awakening (band) albums
1999 albums